was the 12th daimyō of Fukui Domain under the Edo period Tokugawa shogunate in Echizen Province.  He ruled Fukui for 41 years, the longest of any daimyō of Fukui Domain.

Biography
Shigetomi was born in Edo as the third son of Tokugawa Munetada, founder of the Hitotsubashi-Tokugawa family, one of the Gosankyō, the three lesser branches of the Tokugawa clan. His childhood name was Senchiyō (仙千代) later become Sennosuke (仙之助).

On the death of his elder half-brother, Matsudaira Shigemasa of Fukui Domain in 1758, he was posthumously adopted as heir and became daimyō. In 1760 he underwent the genpuku ceremony and received a character from Shōgun Tokugawa Ieshige’s name to become Matsudaira Shigetomi.

During his tenure, he attempted to make fiscal reforms; however, damage caused by heavy snow, fires, windstorms, flood and epidemics in consecutive years thwarted his efforts, and the domain’s finances continued to deteriorate. Shigetomi was also accustomed to a luxurious lifestyle from his youth in the Hitotsubashi household. As revenues ran out, he imposed special taxes on the rice merchants to maintain these luxuries. This resulted in higher rice prices and great public dissatisfaction, cumulating in a massive riot in Fukui in 1768. Unable to suppress the rebellion, the domain officials were forced to agree to public demands, and to dispose of corrupt officials and merchants.

As a close relative of the shogunal house Shigetomi was uncle to Tokugawa Ienari, the domain was able to call on the central government for financial assistance. However, the Great Tenmei famine hit the domain hard. Shigetomi made rapeseed a domain monopoly in 1790, and salt in 1799. In 1799, he retired from public life in favor of his son. He also used his status to revive the honorary status of the domain, raising his court rank from Junior Fourth Rank, Upper Grade to Senior Fourth Rank, Lower Grade and his courtesy title from Sakon'e-gon-shōjō to Sakon'e-gon-chūjō.

He was married to a daughter of Tokugawa Munenobu of Kii Domain. His graves are at the clan temple of Kaian-ji in Shinagawa Tokyo and Unshō-ji in Fukui.

Family
 Father: Tokugawa Munetada
 Mother: Oyuku no Kata
 Wife: Ichihime, daughter of Tokugawa Munenobu
 Concubines:
 Fukuyama-dono
 Okayama-dono
 Son: Matsudaira Haruyoshi by Ichihime

External links
 "Fukui" at Edo 300 
  越前松平氏 (Echizen Matsudaira) at ReichsArchiv.jp

Notes

1748 births
1808 deaths
Shinpan daimyo
Fukui-Matsudaira clan
Tokugawa clan
People of Edo-period Japan